The Ogre is a 1996 French-German-British war drama film directed by Volker Schlöndorff and starring John Malkovich, Gottfried John, Marianne Sägebrecht, Volker Spengler, Heino Ferch, Dieter Laser and Armin Mueller-Stahl. It was written by Jean-Claude Carrière and Schlöndorff, based on the novel The Erl-King by Michel Tournier. The story follows a simple man who recruits children to be Nazis in the belief that he is protecting them.

Plot 
Abel Tiffauges (Malkovich) is a simple Frenchman at the start of World War II who loves animals and children. The first part of the film recalls his childhood at a sadistic Catholic school for boys where he prays to Saint Christopher that the school, which he sees as a prison, be burned down. By chance, while Abel is being disciplined for spilling lamp oil on the chapel floor, his friend Nestor accidentally sets fire to the building, burning it down as he wished. From that day on, Abel is convinced that fate is on his side, and that it will protect him from anything.

In 1940, Abel works as a car mechanic in Paris. His hobby is photography, and he befriends and photographs the local children. However, on one occasion a girl named Martine takes his camera; he tells her off and upsets her. She then falsely accuses him of assaulting her. The police believe her, and he is put on trial. Fortunately for Abel, Germany has invaded France, and soldiers are urgently needed on the front. As a punishment for his supposed crime, he is conscripted to the army to fight off the invaders.

After France surrenders, Abel and his comrades are sent to a prisoner-of-war camp in East Prussia. Abel is often able to sneak away from the camp to a hunting cabin in the forest where he feeds a blind moose. One day, he encounters a German officer  who is curious about his affinity for animals and tells him that the moose is known as The Ogre to the local peasants before telling him to return to the camp and to stop visiting the cabin. 
Several weeks later, the officer returns to Abel, and removes him from the camp. He takes him to Hermann Göring's hunting lodge where the Chief Forester gives him a job looking after the animals on the estate. 
When Göring (Spengler) arrives, he first seems cheerful and friendly, but it is soon clear that he is sadistic, bombastic and mentally unstable. After hearing news that he is needed in Berlin because of the failure of the German Army at Stalingrad on the Eastern Front, Göring becomes depressed and bitter, and abruptly fires his whole staff at the lodge - including Abel. Before leaving, however, the now-former Chief Forester arranges for Abel to be given a new job at the nearby Kaltenborn Castle, a Nazi academy for boys.

At the castle, he instantly proves popular with the boys, and is treated by the staff as a privileged servant. One day, he is out riding, and comes across a group of boys on holiday. He tells them of life in the castle and they follow him back. An SS officer, Obersturmbannführer Raufeisen, is impressed and gives him the job of recruiting local boys into the academy. Although he is successful and means well in his efforts, Abel soon learns from the castle housekeeper, Mrs. Netta, that the locals are afraid of him for taking the boys, and that they have published pamphlets telling parents to watch out for "The Ogre", his newly-acquired nickname. Abel begins to develop doubts about his work. Several days later, one of the boys he recruited is left horribly burned during training from standing behind another boy as he fires a Panzerfaust, making Abel yet more uncertain of the Nazis. Soon after, the owner of the academy, Count Kaltenborn (Mueller-Stahl), is revealed to have been part of a plot to kill Hitler. He is arrested and taken away in a car, and is never seen again. Meanwhile, news has broken out that the Red Army has crossed into East Prussia, and the officers in charge of the castle, as well as the oldest boys training there, are sent out to the front line.

One night while out riding, Abel finds a column of prisoners being taken through the forest, and sees one being shot by a German soldier. When they have gone he approaches the road and finds that it is littered with dead bodies. Under the pile of corpses, he finds a boy named Ephraim who is barely alive and takes him to the castle where he hides him in the attic. With all the officers dead or at the front, Abel and Frau Netta are now in charge of the castle. Frau Netta stays on, trying to look after the boys, but Abel realizes that Hitler and the Nazis have lied - there will be no victory, and a last stand at the castle would be pointless. Abel gathers the remaining cadets and orders them to prepare to evacuate. Caught up in a patriotic fervor, they deem Abel a traitor and knock him unconscious. Shortly afterward, a group of German veteran soldiers arrives. Led by Raufeisen, they take command of Kaltenborn Castle, promising the boys a victorious battle for the Fatherland.

That night, Abel regains consciousness and returns to the attic. The Soviets soon arrive, and a senior officer demands the castle's surrender. Abel tries to surrender the castle, but Raufeisen nearly shoots him with a rifle and the boys open fire on the Soviet soldiers. As the battle escalates, Abel finds Ephraim and leaves the castle with him. The castle catches fire during the fighting; it burns down and none of the defenders survive. They escape across the marshes safely, with Abel recalling the tale of St. Christopher, and the scene fades to black.

Production 
Schlöndorff's idea to create the film originally stemmed from his desire to create a sequel to his 1979 film The Tin Drum, since the film only covered part of the Günter Grass novel on which it was based, but the main cast member David Bennent had grown out of the role and Schlöndorff was unwilling to recast the role. Schlöndorff decided that Tournier's novel reflected his specific interest in the war in particular. 
Filming began in 1995 on location in Malbork and Paris, with Ezio Frigerio as production designer, who intentionally made the sets look as if they were from a fairytale. Michael Nyman wrote the soundtrack, three years after his huge international success with The Piano.

Reception 
Although filmed in English, The Ogre was not initially released in the United Kingdom or the U.S. It had a limited theatrical release in the U.S. in 1998-1999 and was made available on DVD by Kino International. It generally received positive reviews on its cinema release and DVD release, and holds an 89% "fresh" rating on Rotten Tomatoes based on nine reviews.

Music 

The score is composed by Michael Nyman and features strictly brass, woodwind, and percussion instruments by members of the Michael Nyman Band.  The music was rerecorded by Wingates Band, with the woodwind parts transcribed for brass, on the 2006 album, Nyman Brass.

Track listing
Knights at School (6.58)
Child Bearer (5.26)
Abel's Fate (1.44)
Meeting the Moose (4.58)
Magic Forest (1.31)
Into the Woods (1.40)
Göering's Hunting Party (3.43)
Göering's Gotterdämmerung (2.49)
Masuria (2.03)
Abel's List (2.07)
Beware of the Ogre (4.01)
Death Marches (3.24)
Night Moves (1.23)
Abel's Revolt (5.34)
Abel Carries Ephraim (5.56)
End Titles (5.52)

Personnel
John Harle, soprano/alto saxophones
David Roach, soprano/alto/tenor saxophones
Simon Haram, soprano/alto saxophones
Andrew Findon, baritone saxophone/flute/piccolo
Steve Sidwell, trumpet/piccolo trumpet/flugelhorn
Nigel Gomm, trumpet/flugel
Dave Lee, horn/Wagner tuba
Nigel Black, horn, Wagner tuba
Paul Gargham, horn, Wagner tuba
Richard Clews, horn, Wagner tuba
Chris Davies, horn, Wagner tuba
Andrew Berryman, trombone
Nigel Barr, bass trombone/tuba
Gary Kettel, drums
Michael Nyman, composer and director
Published by Michael Nyman Productions Ltd./Chester Music Ltd.
Music editor: Martin Elliott
Produced by Michael Nyman
Recorded at Landsdowne Studios
Mixed at Landsdowne Studios
Edited at Metropolis Studios
Engineer Michael J. Dutton
Artist representative for Michael Nyman: Nigel Barr
Photographs of Michael Nyman by The Douglas Brothers
Design and illustration by Dave McKean@Hourglass

References

External links 

 

1996 drama films
1996 films
British drama films
French drama films
German drama films
Films about Nazi Germany
Films based on French novels
Films shot in Poland
Films shot in Paris
1990s British films
Albums with cover art by Dave McKean
Films set in Prussia
Films set in Paris
Films directed by Volker Schlöndorff
Films with screenplays by Jean-Claude Carrière
Films scored by Michael Nyman
Films set in castles
English-language French films
English-language German films
1990s English-language films
1990s French films
1990s German films
German war drama films
French war drama films
British war drama films
Eastern Front of World War II films
Western Front of World War II films